Senthil Kumar (born 18 October 1978), popularly known as Mirchi Senthil  is an Indian film and television actor, television presenter, radio jockey and voice actor. He began his career as a radio jockey  with the radio station Radio Mirchi. He performed in the lead character Saravanan in STAR Vijay's  sensational serial Saravannan Meenatchi. Senthil and his co-star Sreeja Chandran had married on 2 July 2014 in a private function in Tirupathi. He made his debut as a film actor in Thavamai Thavamirundhu and has continued acting in lead roles in Sengathu Bhoomiyilae, Kan Pesum Vaarthaigal, Vennila Veedu and  more.

Personal life
Senthil was born in Chennai on 18 October 1978 to S. Govindan and Premavathy. He did his schooling in Don Bosco Higher Secondary School, Chennai. He has completed his Bachelors (BCom) at Pachaiyappa's College, Chennai and Masters (Master of Finance and Control) at Madurai Kamaraj University. He had a brief career stint in the banking industry before he moved on to the media. He married  his co-star of Madurai & Saravanan Meenatchi Tamil serials fame Malayalam-Tamil actress Sreeja Chandran.  Senthil confirmed his marriage with Sreeja on his radio show Neenga Naan Raja Sir on 8 July 2014. His sudden marriage announcement created a buzz amongst their thousands of worldwide fans in joy of their marriage.

Career

Radio

Senthil joined Radio Mirchi, Chennai as a Radio Jockey in 2003 and has performed various roles such as Radio producer, EP and Programming Head. Later he moved to Coimbatore to head Coimbatore Radio Mirchi for 4 years. He has hosted many shows like Mirchi Gold, Mirchi Bazaar, Pettai Raap and Love Talkies. He presented the program Neenga Naan Raja Sir which is a special on Ilaiyaraaja's music that was aired between 9 PM and 11PM from Monday to Saturday. This was a very popular program and was acknowledged and endorsed by Ilaiyaraaja himself. In 2016 May, he finished that show and started a new show called "Sentilin Sutta Kadhai" (Senthil's stolen stories), which tell interesting short moral stories from around earth.

Television
Senthil played the lead character in the successful television serial named Madurai  in STAR Vijay telecasted from 2007 to 2009. Following the success of this serial, Senthil has played the lead character by the name Saravanan again in another sensational serial Saravanan Meenatchi in STAR Vijay. Senthil rose to fame following his performances in these two serials and is very well known by his character name Saravanan.

Senthil has performed in a micro-serial 777 for Polimer TV which was directed by the movie director Manobala.

Apart from the serials, Senthil has  hosted a number of shows for STAR Vijay. He has hosted a weekly movie review show Tamil Cinema Indha Vaaram in which he discusses about the movies along with the cast and crew of the movie. Senthil has conducted a game show for women by name Boxing for Polimer TV.

Film
Senthil made his Tamil film debut in the 2005 film Thavamai Thavamirundhu in which he played the elder brother of director Cheran. He was nominated for the Filmfare Awards for the Best Supporting Actor. He got his first lead role in the movie Sengathu Bhoomiyilae. He continued to act in lead roles in films like Kan Pesum Vaarthaigal, Pappali, Vennila Veedu, Rombha Nallavan Da Nee, etc. These films didn’t fare well at the box office, however.

Filmography

As actor

As Radio Jockey

 Love Talkies is a unique concept in radio in which stories and characters are created and played along with the Tamil movie songs. Senthil has been a part of many radio movies.

Appearance in Television

As Television presenter
 A song review show Gaanamum Kaatchiyum for the TV channel Puthuyugam
 Tamil Cinema Indha Vaaram for Star Vijay
 Kadal Movie Special for Star Vijay
 Paradesi Movie Special for Star Vijay
 Ajith special for Star Vijay
 Dhanush special for Star Vijay

Awards and honours

References

External links
 

Tamil male actors
Male actors from Chennai
Indian radio presenters
Living people
1978 births
21st-century Indian male actors
Male actors in Tamil cinema